In mathematics, specifically number theory, Granville numbers, also known as -perfect numbers, are an extension of the perfect numbers.

The Granville set
In 1996, Andrew Granville proposed the following construction of a set :

Let , and for any integer  larger than 1, let  if

Granville numbers are also called -perfect numbers.

General properties

The elements of  can be -deficient, -perfect, or -abundant.

S-deficient numbers

Numbers that fulfill the strict form of the inequality in the above definition are known as -deficient numbers.

S-perfect numbers

Numbers that fulfill equality in the above definition are known as -perfect numbers. The first few -perfect numbers are:

6, 24, 28, 96, 126, 224, 384, 496, 1536, 1792, 6144, 8128, 14336, ... 

Every perfect number is also -perfect. However, there are numbers such as 24 which are -perfect but not perfect. The only known -perfect number with three distinct prime factors is 126 = 2 · 32 · 7 .

S-abundant numbers

Numbers that violate the inequality in the above definition are known as -abundant numbers.

The first few -abundant numbers are:

12, 18, 20, 30, 42, 48, 56, 66, 70, 72, 78, 80, 84, 88, 90, 102, 104, ...

Examples
Every deficient number and every perfect number is in  because the restriction of the divisors sum to members of  either decreases the divisors sum or leaves it unchanged.

1 + 2 + 3 + 4 + 6 + 8 = 24

In fact, 24 is -perfect - it is the smallest number that is -perfect but not perfect.

References

Number theory